Nimród Baranyai (born 6 August 2003) is a Hungarian professional footballer who plays for OTP Bank Liga club Mezőkövesd on loan from Debrecen.

Career
On 8 February 2023, Baranyai joined Mezőkövesd on loan.

Career statistics

References

External links
 
 

2003 births
Living people
People from Debrecen
Hungarian footballers
Association football defenders
Debreceni VSC players
Mezőkövesdi SE footballers
Nemzeti Bajnokság I players